Kampong Dato Gandi is a village in Brunei-Muara District, Brunei. The population was 424 in 2016. It is one of the villages within Mukim Kota Batu. The postcode is BD1717.

References 

Dato Gandi